Llanerch is an unincorporated community on the border of Haverford Township and Upper Darby Township in Delaware County, Pennsylvania, United States. Llanerch is located at the intersection of U.S. Route 1, Pennsylvania Route 3, and Darby Road.

Silver Linings Playbook 
Several scenes from the movie, Silver Linings Playbook, were shot in Llanerch, such as The Llanerch Diner, located on U.S. Route 1, where the diner scene was shot.

References

Unincorporated communities in Delaware County, Pennsylvania
Unincorporated communities in Pennsylvania